Apozomus is a genus of hubbardiid short-tailed whipscorpions, first described by Mark Harvey in 1992.

Species 
, the World Schizomida Catalog accepts the following nineteen species:
 Apozomus alligator Harvey, 1992 – Australia
 Apozomus brignolii Cokendolpher & Reddell, 2000 – Marshall Islands
 Apozomus buxtoni (Gravely, 1915) – Sri Lanka
 Apozomus cactus Harvey, 1992 – Australia
 Apozomus daitoensis (Shimojana, 1981) – Japan
 Apozomus eberhardi Harvey, 2001 – Australia
 Apozomus gerlachi Harvey, 2001 – Seychelles
 Apozomus gunn Harvey, 1992 – Australia
 Apozomus howarthi Harvey, 2001 – Australia
 Apozomus pellew Harvey, 1992 – Australia
 Apozomus rupina Harvey, 1992 – Australia
 Apozomus sauteri (Kraepelin, 1911) – China, Japan, Taiwan, Vietnam
 Apozomus termitarium Cokendolpher, Sissom & Reddell, 2010 – Malaysia
 Apozomus volschenki Harvey, 2001 – Australia
 Apozomus watsoni Harvey, 1992 – Australia
 Apozomus weiri Harvey, 1992 – Australia
 Apozomus yamasakii (Cokendolpher, 1988) – Taiwan
 Apozomus yirrkala Harvey, 1992 – Australia
 Apozomus zhensis (Chen & Song, 1996) – China

References 

Schizomida genera